Euthyone is a genus of moths in the subfamily Arctiinae. The genus was erected by Watson, Fletcher and Nye in 1980.

Species
 Euthyone celenna
 Euthyone dremma
 Euthyone grisescens
 Euthyone melanocera
 Euthyone muricolor
 Euthyone parima
 Euthyone perbella
 Euthyone placida
 Euthyone purpurea
 Euthyone simplex
 Euthyone theodula
 Euthyone tincta
 Euthyone trimaculata

References

External links

Lithosiini
Moth genera